Music from Man of La Mancha is a studio album by Brazilian jazz pianist and singer Eliane Elias. The album was recorded in 1995 but released by Concord only on April 13, 2018.

Background
Music from Man of La Mancha is Elias' 26th full-length album. The tracks for the album were recorded as early as in 1995 and produced by Elias together with Mitch Leigh, the late composer of the music for the Broadway musical Man of La Mancha that premiered in 1964. The production was inspired by an earlier, 1959 non-musical stage production, I, Don Quixote, itself inspired by Miguel de Cervantes' 17th-century masterpiece Don Quixote. The album was not released for so long because of contractual limitations; Leigh passed in 2014 and never saw its release.

Chart performance
The album debuted at No. 1 on the Billboard magazine Traditional Jazz Chart and No. 20 on Top Heatseekers one week after its release.

Reception
Bobby Reed of DownBeat stated, "Melodies, melodies, sumptuous melodies. That's the central attraction of Eliane Elias' new album, which also features dazzling bouts of improvisation... Elias and her collaborators recorded this material in 1995, but due to contractual obstacles, it was never released. Now, with the blessing of the Leigh family, this gem finally is available. One need not have any familiarity with the stage or film versions of Man of La Mancha to enjoy this excellent album, which is filled with hummable melodies and Elias' impressive, right-hand improv flourishes. Deftly avoiding sentimentality and cliché, the pianist has crafted a compelling samba arrangement of "The Impossible Dream" (one of the show's most often-interpreted tunes). Elias utilized the Brazilian rhythm of frevo in her arrangement of "A Little Gossip," which is spiced with an agile solo by Johnson. "I'm Only Thinking of Him," which features Gomez and DeJohnette, feels completely fresh in 2018."

Christopher Loudon of JazzTimes commented "...it is an immensely lush album, a vibrant fusion of Elias' Brazilian verve and the music's Latin-meets-Broadway zest—from a shimmering "Dulcinea," gently roiling "It's All the Same" and stirringly contemplative "The Barber's Song," to a fiery, passionate "To Each His Dulcinea" and the Carnaval-esque rumpus of "A Little Gossip." And, yes, "Dream" is here: freed of the bombast pop vocalists have typically lent it, masterfully reimagined as a spirited samba".

Track listing

Personnel

Band
Eliane Elias – piano, arranger, liner notes, producer
Eddie Gomez – bass
Marc Johnson – bass
Jack DeJohnette – drums
Satoshi Takeishi – drums
Manolo Badrena – percussion

Production
Paul Blakemore – mastering
Mitch Leigh – producer
Hans Liebert – engineer
Christine Martin – executive producer
Steve Rodby – digital mastering
Priscila Silvestre – photography
Carrie Smith – layout

References

External links

2018 albums
Eliane Elias albums
Music based on Don Quixote